Kolvereid is a town in the municipality of Nærøysund in Trøndelag county, Norway. The town of Kolvereid is located at the west end of the Kolvereidvågen bay, off of the inner part of the Foldafjord. The Norwegian County Road 770 runs through the town, connecting it to Rørvik to the west and Foldereid to the east.

The town was the administrative centre of the old Nærøy Municipality until 2020 when it was merged into Nærøysund Municipality.

The municipality of Nærøy declared town status for the village of Kolvereid in 2002, making it the smallest town in Norway.

Kolvereid is located in the middle of Nærøy, with the town located on the shore of the Foldafjord. The area has grown considerably over the past 30 years. It has a well-developed trade and service industry. Kolvereid is home to the municipality's culture centre, comprising a stage and a cinema, a sports hall, as well as outdoor sports facilities. Kolvereid Church dates back to 1874; the church was designed by architect Jacob Wilhelm Nordan. It was built of wood and has 350 seats.

Kolvereid was the administrative centre of the old municipality of Kolvereid which existed from 1838 until 1964.

Notable residents
 Betzy Holter (1893–1979), actress

References

External links
Kolvereid.no
Kaakenmagasinet.com
Nærøy kommune

Nærøysund
Cities and towns in Norway
Populated places in Trøndelag
2002 establishments in Norway